Ife South is a Local Government Area in Osun State, Nigeria.

It has an area of 730 km and its population was 135,338 at the 2006 census.

The postal code of the area is 220.

References

Local Government Areas in Osun State